Joels Drift is a town in Lesotho.

References

Populated places in Lesotho